SC Weiz is an Austrian association football club founded in 1924 and finished in 13th position in the Austrian Regional League Central during the 2017–18 season, securing a place in the same league for 2018–19.

Current squad

Staff and board members

 Manager:  Bruno Friesenbichler
 Assistant manager: Hermann Wagner
 Goalkeeper coach:  Matthias Mayer
 Physio:  Ernst Fink
 Chairman  Sandro Derler
 Honorary President:  Helmut Kienreich

External links
 

Association football clubs established in 1924
Weiz, SC
1924 establishments in Austria